"Forever in Your Hands" is the third single from the album Overcome by American heavy metal band All That Remains. The single contains the first full acoustic song by the band ever to be recorded in the studio. It is their second single to crack the top 20 in the Hot Mainstream Rock Tracks chart, peaking at number 15.

The music video premiered on October 7, 2009.

An alternate version of the music video premiered on November 30, 2009.

On April 8, 2010, the song is available as a playable track for the Rock Band Network.

Track listing

Charts

References

2009 singles
2000s ballads
Heavy metal ballads
All That Remains (band) songs
2008 songs
Songs written by Jason Costa
Songs written by Philip Labonte